Marta Wieliczko (born 1 October 1994) is a Polish rower. She won the gold medal in the quadruple sculls at the 2018 World Rowing Championships.

References

External links

1994 births
Living people
Polish female rowers
World Rowing Championships medalists for Poland
Place of birth missing (living people)
Olympic rowers of Poland
Rowers at the 2020 Summer Olympics
Olympic silver medalists for Poland
Medalists at the 2020 Summer Olympics
Olympic medalists in rowing
Sportspeople from Gdańsk